Woldstedtius is a genus of parasitoid wasps belonging to the family Ichneumonidae.

The species of this genus are found in Europe, Australia and America.

Species:
 Woldstedtius abditus (Diller, 1980)
 Woldstedtius ambreui Diller, 1982
 Woldstedtius bauri Klopfstein, 2014

References

Ichneumonidae
Ichneumonidae genera